Václav Dosbaba (January 8, 1945 − February 4, 2012) was a Czech painter. He has exhibited in Brno, Louny, Ostrava, Prague, Litomyšl, Zlín and abroad in the U.S., Austria. He joined the Group 4 in 1971.

Bibliography
 Václav Dosbaba. In: Šlépěje. 1995, č.7, s.50-52,fot.
 Schwarz, Jan. Retrospektiva Václava Dosbaby. In: Horácké noviny. Roč. 6, 1995, (01.08.1995), s.7,fot.

See also
List of Czech painters

References

Czech painters
Czech male painters
1945 births
2012 deaths